Woman's Club of Warren, also known as the Myron Waters House, is a historic home located at Warren, Warren County, Pennsylvania.  It was built in 1872, and is a three-story, brick building with a two-story addition in the Italianate style. It has a shallow pitched hipped roof, entry porch with segmented arched roof, and three-story bay window. It was originally a residence, then acquired by the Woman's Club of Warren in 1922.  A 500-seat auditorium was added in 1924 to the rear of the dwelling.

It was added to the National Register of Historic Places in 1996.

References

External links
Woman's Club of Warren website

Women's club buildings
Clubhouses on the National Register of Historic Places in Pennsylvania
Italianate architecture in Pennsylvania
Houses completed in 1872
Houses in Warren County, Pennsylvania
History of women in Pennsylvania
National Register of Historic Places in Warren County, Pennsylvania
Buildings and structures in Warren, Pennsylvania